Joshua Ryan Freese (born December 25, 1972) is an American session drummer. He is the son of tuba soloist Stan Freese and the older brother of musician Jason Freese.

He is a member of the Vandals (since 1989) and Devo (since 1996), having formerly played drums for Guns N' Roses from 1997 to 2000, A Perfect Circle from 1999 to 2012, Nine Inch Nails from 2005 to 2008, Weezer from 2009 to 2011, and Sublime with Rome from 2011 to 2017. He has appeared on over 400 records. In December 2010, Freese began touring with Paramore on their South American tour. In fall 2016 he returned to playing full-time with Sting, with whom he toured and recorded in 2005. Freese performed with Foo Fighters for the Taylor Hawkins Tribute Concerts.

Early life 
Josh Freese was born on December 25, 1972, in Orlando, Florida, U.S.A. His father, Stan Freese, conducted the Disney World (Florida) and Disneyland (California) band, and his mother was a classical pianist. Freese began playing the drums when he was 8 years old. He started playing professionally at the age of 12 (in a primarily Top 40 band at Disneyland). He played electronic drums in the teen-and-tween rock band named Polo, a Junior Star Search winner. Polo already had a drummer before joining the Magic Kingdom, band founder Jimmy Keegan, but they found room on stage for the son of Disneyland's Director of Bands, Stan Freese. Other bands on the same stage were limited to performing Top 40 hits, but such constraints did not apply to Polo. The band recorded and released an eponymous EP that received some airplay on KROQ.

The young Freese's familial connections and corresponding exposure led to an endorsement deal with the Simmons electronic drum company. There is an old Simmons commercial (directed by Mitch Brisker), featuring Freese on the additional content section of the Vandals' Live at the House of Blues DVD. At the age of 16, he left high school and started touring and making records, first with Dweezil Zappa and then with the Vandals. He has worked with many respected artists in the last 25 years, as a first call session drummer, band member and sometimes as a temporary replacement. Freese's younger brother, Jason Freese, plays keyboards in Green Day and has also recorded and toured with the Goo Goo Dolls, Dr. Dre, Jewel, Lenny Kravitz, Liz Phair, Foxboro Hot Tubs, Joe Walsh, and Weezer.

Solo work

Early solo releases 
In 1998, Freese recorded a number of songs that he wrote and performed himself (including bass, guitar, keyboards and vocals). The result is the lo-fi, 6-song EP Destroy Earth As Soon As Possible, released under the name 'Princess' by T.O.N/Stone Lizard Records.

In 2000, the songs "Caffeine and Vaseline" and "Rock N' Roll Chicken" were revived for the 12-song album The Notorious One Man Orgy, this time released under Freese's own name by Kung Fu Records. Guest appearances include Stone Gossard, Warren Fitzgerald, Michael Ward, Lyle Workman, and Freese's brother Jason.

Since 1972 (2009) 
Josh released his second solo album, Since 1972, via his website on March 24, 2009. Since 1972 was distributed similarly to the value-added packages offered by Nine Inch Nails's recent releases. Freese's album was offered as a $7 digital download, and a $15 CD/DVD on his website. As a marketing stunt, the website offers unique incentive packages at prices up to $75,000. Publications covering the offer include SuicideGirls, The UK's The Guardian, NPR, and Boston Herald.

Freese states on his purchase page for the album: "I'm not expecting to sell any of those ridiculously priced packages but I sure did get a lot of good press and attention to the fact that I'm putting out a record because of it! Mission accomplished."

Work history 
Freese started his drumming career in a Top 40 cover band at the Tomorrowland Terrace Stage at Disneyland from 1985 to 1988. Freese has since been a member of punk rock band the Vandals since 1989, and has played on all the band's albums since then, with the exception of 2000's Look What I Almost Stepped In..., on which current Avenged Sevenfold drummer Brooks Wackerman was deputised due to Freese's commitments with A Perfect Circle. In 2004, the Vandals released a live DVD as part of Kung Fu Records' The Show Must Go Off! series. The DVD is of particular interest to Josh Freese fans thanks to the inclusion of the Josh Freese-cam, a camera focused on Freese for the entire duration of the show, also including a picture-in-picture of Freese's kick drum pedal.

Freese played on the Infectious Grooves album "Sarsippius' Ark and on the Suicidal Tendencies album The Art of Rebellion in 1992. He played on the Korean group Seo Taiji and Boys' 1994 and 1995 albums Seo Taiji and Boys III and Seo Taiji and Boys IV. He was a member of Guns N' Roses from 1997 to 1999, replacing Matt Sorum and signing a 2-year contract. He recorded the song "Oh My God" for the End of Days soundtrack and  co-wrote the song "Chinese Democracy" with Axl Rose. Freese drummed on 30 tracks to potentially be included on Chinese Democracy, but his recordings were scrapped and re-recorded note-for-note by Bryan Mantia. He was credited with arrangements on four tracks on the final release of the album. He left the band in 2000 to launch A Perfect Circle with Maynard James Keenan and Billy Howerdel.

In 1996, Freese joined a reformed Devo for a show at the Sundance Film Festival, replacing David Kendrick. Freese has become their primary drummer in concert and in the studio since. Freese has said that he learned to play drums thanks to Devo's 1980 album Freedom of Choice. Freese played drums on Devo's 2010 album Something for Everybody, and provided backing vocals on Devo's non-album holiday song, "Merry Something to You".

In 1999, Freese drummed on Mike Ness' first solo album Cheating At Solitaire, but was replaced by Charlie Quintana when it came to live performances. In 2011, he drummed on Social Distortion's seventh studio album Hard Times And Nursery Rhymes. After the album's release, David Hidalgo Jr. became Social Distortion's current full-time drummer

In 2002 he played session drums on The Young and the Hopeless by Good Charlotte. Freese was the session drummer on the 2003 album Fallen by Evanescence and on the Acroma album released on Universal Records. He has drummed for A Perfect Circle since their first album, and is considered one of the core members. As of 2006, the band is on hiatus. Since then, founder Billy Howerdel has started up a new band (Ashes Divide) with drums contributed by Freese. Freese took over from drummer Ron Welty for the recording of the Offspring's 2003 album Splinter after Welty's departure from the band. He is credited for playing drums on the album, but Atom Willard later took on the position as the band's full-time drummer. In July 2007, it was announced Atom Willard had left the band. He would be replaced by Pete Parada. In the meantime, Freese was called upon to record the new Offspring album, Rise and Fall, Rage and Grace. In January 2011, he mentioned on his website that he was working with the Offspring again on their next album Days Go By. He also recorded drums for Static-X on their 2003 album Shadow Zone after the departure of original drummer Ken Jay. Freese was also the session drummer on Brian "Head" Welch's debut solo album, Save Me From Myself (album).

Freese participated in Sting's "Broken Music Tour" in April 2005 with guitarist Dominic Miller and guitarist Shane Fontayne. The tour kicked off April 1 in San Jose, California and ended on May 14 in New York. Josh also appeared with Sting during the record breaking 'Live 8' concert in London's Hyde Park on July 2, 2005. In fall of 2005 he recorded new material with Sting in Italy at the singer's Tuscany estate but plans for release have yet to be set.

Freese contributed drum tracks for Lostprophets' third album, Liberation Transmission, recording all his parts in two days. Travis Barker was originally earmarked as the session drummer of choice for the album, but producer Bob Rock, who had worked with Freese before, wanted him instead. Freese has worked on and off with Paul Westerberg since 1992 and provided the drums on two Replacements tracks, that appear on their greatest-hits package, "Don't You Know Who I Think I Was".

Freese toured with Nine Inch Nails on their 2005–06 With Teeth winter arena and summer amphitheater tours after the illness of drummer Jerome Dillon. He contributed live drum tracks to the songs "Hyperpower!" and "Capital G" on the Nine Inch Nails album Year zero, released in 2007. Freese continued touring with Nine Inch Nails throughout 2007 in support of Year Zero, mainly outside of the U.S. In 2008, he worked with Trent Reznor in the studio on The Slip and signed on for more extensive North American and overseas touring with the band through 2008 on their "Lights in the Sky" 2008 tour. He left the tour at the end of 2008 in order to spend more time with his family and long-time girlfriend, who was pregnant with the couple's third child at the time.

Freese also completed drum tracks for the band Black Light Burns, which consists of Wes Borland (Limp Bizkit, Big Dumb Face, From First to Last), Danny Lohner (Nine Inch Nails) and Josh Eustis (Telefon Tel Aviv). He also played on Rebel Hiss which is the first single from Jubilee headed by ex-bandmate (and ex lead guitarist for Nine Inch Nails) Aaron North on guitar and vocals.

He has co-written songs with Queens of the Stone Age, the Vandals, A Perfect Circle, Dwarves, Goon Moon, Devo and Sting.

He played on drums for a small selection of Hollywood Undead songs on their debut album, Swan Songs. He also played some shows in early 1998 with the band 311 as a fill-in drummer for them on the Warped tour in Australia, Japan and Hawaii. Chad Sexton, 311's drummer had broken a hand just before a show in Australia early in the tour. Freese was already on the tour playing with the Vandals every day and played with both bands for the majority of the tour. Freese filled in for an injured Claude Coleman, Jr. on Ween's 2003 album Quebec. Freese performed the drums on Daughtry's debut album by the same title, Daughtry.

Freese performed with Weezer in their support of Blink-182's 2009 tour, as Weezer drummer Patrick Wilson played guitar for 90% of Weezer's set. Freese continued to tour with Weezer in 2010 and 2011 as well as appearing live with Sting, the Vandals and Devo. Freese also played drums on Japanese Mega-star Ayumi Hamasaki's 2009 album NEXT LEVEL, on the track "identity". Freese can also be heard on the Weezer release Raditude and on Michael Bublé's tracks "Crazy Love" and "Haven't Met You Yet".

On August 3, 2010, Josh Freese posted via Facebook "I'm happy to report that A Perfect Circle is waking up from its 6-year slumber...and we're going to be 'doing stuff' soon." Freese toured in 2012 with Sublime with Rome after Bud Gaugh announced his departure from the band.

In 2011, Freese became the touring drummer for Paramore on the South American leg of their Brand New Eyes World Tour after the band announced the departure of the Farro brothers (Zac and Josh). On October 2, 2012, Freese announced via his Twitter page: "After 13 years, I've decided to leave A Perfect Circle with no plans of returning." He played drums with the Replacements in August and September 2013 as the Replacements played their first gigs in 22 years (Riot Fest 2013). Freese continued playing in the Replacements in their 2014 and 2015 shows. He appears on the 2014 Bruce Springsteen album High Hopes, playing drums on "This Is Your Sword". In August 2021, he joined The Offspring on their tour after the band fired their ex-drummer Pete Parada from the group due to his COVID-19 vaccination status.

In 2022, he played drums with 100 gecs as well as Danny Elfman at the Coachella Music & Arts Festival in Indio, California.

Personal life 
Freese lives in Southern California with his wife and their four children.

Equipment 
In a 2007 Guitar Center interview, Freese stated:

"My set up never gets that crazy or out of the ordinary I don't think. You can pretty much always count on starting off with the basic Ringo 4 piece set up and add from there. With the Vandals that's all I use. With Devo add a second rack tom. With NIN keep only 1 rack but have 2 floors and a 3rd floor off to the left of my hi-hat (with NIN the drums are all about 2 inches bigger than I normally would use... 14 rack. 24 kick, 18 and 20-inch floors... 16 off the side of my hihat). With A Perfect Circle 2 racks and 2 floors, 2nd snare off the left of my hihat... more cymbals with APC too. With Sting there are 3 racks but smaller sizes and only 1 floor. Never too many cymbals (except with APC I guess). In the studio my drums are usually something really basic a 4, 5, or 6 piece kit with lots of snare and cymbal choices."

Discography 

Solo discography
Destroy Earth As Soon As Possible (1998, as "Princess")
The Notorious One Man Orgy (2000)
Since 1972 (2009)
My New Friends (2011)

References

External links 
 
 "Interview with Josh Freese" – I'd Hit That (podcast, 2013) – via Internet Archive

1972 births
20th-century American drummers
21st-century American drummers
A Perfect Circle members
American male drummers
American punk rock drummers
American rock drummers
American session musicians
Black Light Burns members
Devo members
Guns N' Roses members
Living people
Magnapop members
Musicians from Orlando, Florida
Nine Inch Nails members
Seether members
Social Distortion members
Songwriters from Florida
Sublime with Rome members
The Damning Well members
The Vandals members
Viva Death members